Valdemar Oldenburg (1 December 1834 - 6 June 1918) was a Danish jurist who served as Lord President (Overpræsident) of Copenhagen.

Early life and education
Oldenburg was born in Sorterup, the son of T. Oldenburg (1805-42) and Louise Rothe (1808-91). His father was the local pastor. He matriculated from Copenhagen's Metropolitan School in 1853 before enrolling at the University of Copenhagen from where he achieved his law degree in 1859. He worked as assistant in the Ministry for Slesvig from 1859 and passed the Slesvig legal exam in 1861.

Career
Oldenburg was employed as military prosecutor in 1863 but was fired during the army reduction of 1866. He then taught at the Naval Officers' School (until 1871) and the Army Officers' School (1868-72) before once again being appointed as army prosecutor in 1870.

In 1871, he was appointed as acting Deputy Police Director in Copenhagen. In 1888, he was appointed as judge and scribe of Copenhagen County's northern . In 1900, he was appointed as Lord President in Copenhagen. In 1901, he played a minor role in conjunction with the political reforms. He retired in 1910.

Personal life
Oldenburg married on 2 February 1864 in Copenhagen Henriette Suenson (1839-1895), daughter of first lieutenant and later commander captain Magnus Nicolai Suenson (1802-56) and Augusta Stephansen (1815-1906).

He is depicted on Peder Severin Krøyer's monumental 1904 group portrait painting Men of Industry and Laurits Tuxen's 1906 group portrait painting  Leaving the Table. He died on 6 June 1918 and is buried at Ordrup Cemetery.

Awards
Oldenburg was created a Knight in the Order of the Dannebrog in 1882. In 1885, he was awarded the Cross of Honour. He was created a 2nd-class Commander of the Order of the Dannebrog in 1785 and a 1st-class Commander in 1903. He was awarded the Grand Cross in 1909 and F.M.l. in 1915.

References

Danish jurists
1834 births
1918 deaths